The Turner Collection of Railway Letter Stamps is a collection of railway letter stamps of the United Kingdom from 1891 to the mid-1940s that forms part of the British Library Philatelic Collections. It was formed by S.R. Turner and donated in 1973.

See also
Ewen Collection
Parcel stamp

References

British Library Philatelic Collections
Philately of the United Kingdom
Cinderella stamps